CHRLX (formerly known as Charlex until 2014) is an American animation studio based in New York City that produces animation primarily for commercials.

History
Charlie Levi and Alex Weil founded Charlex (with the name being a portmentau of their first names) in 1979 "with $1,600 and a phone" to support their rock band and to work on commercials. When the band folded, Levi and Weil began working at Charlex full-time. In 1981, Charlex began producing an innovative weekly TV-ad campaign for the National Enquirer, and in 1984, they created The Cars' "You Might Think" music video, for which they were awarded the "Video of the Year" –the very first winner– at the 1984 MTV Video Music Awards. Both projects helped Charlex get more work throughout the 1980s, including network IDs for the Fred/Alan agency, commercials, and opening titles for various programs. In 1986 Charlex produced the groundbreaking Cherry Coke ad that featured multiple composited layers of digital video which was a technical tour de force at the time. 

In 1998, Charlex started using CHRLX as an alternative name for the company (removing the vowels from their name); the Charlex name was slowly phased out until 2014, although it is still CHRLX's legal name. In 2006, Charlex's short film One Rat Short received a Best of Show award at the SIGGRAPH 2006 Computer Animation Festival. CHRLX's co-founder Alex Weil died in 2019, but CHRLX continues to operate under the leadership of Chris Byrnes.

Filmography

Short films
Inner Tube (backgrounds and electronic effects; 1987)
One Rat Short (2006)
Amarelinha (associate producer; 2007)
ShapeShifter (2010)

Music videos
The Cars – "You Might Think" (1984)
The Cars – "Heartbreak City" (transitional links; 1984)
Yes – 9012Live (1985)

Television/film
Saturday Night Live (opening titles; 1984)
Mr. Wizard's World (opening titles; 1985)
National Geographic Explorer (opening titles; 1990)
The Howard Stern Show (show opening; 1990)
The Honeymooners Anniversary Special (video restoration; 1990)
Real Mature (opening sequence; 1991)
TNT 100% Weird (opening sequence; 1992)
Nickelodeon Home Video (opening titles; 1993)
David Blaine: Magic Man (opening graphics; 1998)
On the Run (credit sequence design; 1999)
David Blaine: Frozen in Time (opening graphics; 2000)
Capturing the Friedmans (visual effects; 2003)
Maniac ("Windmills" animation; 2018)

Commercials

American Express
American International Group
AOL
AT&T
Avis
Bass Weejuns
Bausch & Lomb
Blue Bonnet Butter Blend
British Airways
Bubble Yum
Budweiser
Campbell Soup Company
Capella University
Centrum
Charles Schwab Corporation
Cinemax
Cingular
Clairol
Coca-Cola
Crest
Dannon
David Yurman
Diet Pepsi
DirecTV
Dodge
Dole Food Company
Dr. Scholl's
Dunkin' Donuts
E-Trade
Fidelity Investments
Fila
Ford Motor Company
General Electric
General Mills
Georgia Lottery
Gillette
Grey Goose
HA! TV Comedy Network
Häagen-Dazs
Hanna-Barbera
Hannaford
Hasbro
HealthCare.gov
Healthy Choice
The Hershey Company
Holiday Inn
Honeycomb
HTC
IBM
Jarritos
JCPenney
Jell-O
JEM
Ken's Foods
Kodak
Kohl's
Kotex
Krylon
Lifetime
Lucent
M&M's
Maryland Lottery
Maxell
Milk-Bone
The Movie Channel
MSNBC
Myers Rum Video Network
National Enquirer
Nexium
Nextel Communications
NFL
Nickelodeon/Nick at Nite
Nickelodeon Studios
Nike, Inc.
North Texas Municipal Water District
Ocean Spray
Pizza Hut
Polaroid
Procter & Gamble
Ralph Lauren Corporation
Revlon
Ribena
Rite Aid
The Ritz-Carlton Hotel Company
Seagram's Escapes
Seton Healthcare Family
Sprint Corporation
Sony
Sour Patch Kids
Subway
Toshiba REGZA
True Value
Valvoline
Verizon Communications
VH1
Visa Inc.
White Mountain Cooler
WCVB-TV
WTTG-TV
Zale Corporation
Ziploc

External links

References

American animation studios
Mass media companies established in 1979
Privately held companies based in New York City
1979 establishments in New York City